Daprodustat, sold under the brand name Duvroq among others, is a medication that is used for the treatment of anemia due to chronic kidney disease. It is a hypoxia-inducible factor prolyl hydroxylase inhibitor. It is taken by mouth.

The most common side effects include high blood pressure, thrombotic vascular events, abdominal pain, dizziness and allergic reactions. 

Daprodustat was approved for medical use in Japan in June 2020, and in the United States in February 2023. It is the first oral treatment for anemia caused by chronic kidney disease for adults.

Medical uses 
Daprodustat is indicated for the treatment of anemia due to chronic kidney disease.

History 
Daprodustat increases erythropoietin levels. The effectiveness of daprodustat was established in a randomized study of 2,964 adult participants receiving dialysis. In this study, participants received either oral daprodustat or injected recombinant human erythropoietin (a standard of care treatment for people with anemia due to chronic kidney disease). Daprodustat raised and maintained the hemoglobin (the protein in red blood cells that carries oxygen and is a common measure of anemia) within the target range of 10-11 grams/deciliter, similar to that of the recombinant human erythropoietin. The US Food and Drug Administration (FDA) granted the approval of Jesduvroq to GlaxoSmithKline LLC.

Society and culture 
Due to its potential applications in athletic doping, it has also been incorporated into screens for performance-enhancing drugs.

Research 
Daprodustat is in phase III clinical trials for the treatment of anemia caused by chronic kidney disease.

References

External links 
 

Acetic acids
Cyclohexyl compounds
GSK plc brands
Pyrimidinediones